Ship Harbour may refer to the following places:
Ship Harbour, Newfoundland and Labrador
Ship Harbour, Nova Scotia
East Ship Harbour, Nova Scotia
Lower Ship Harbour, Nova Scotia